Admiral William Lloyd was from Carmarthenshire, Wales and became an Admiral of the White for the Royal Navy.    He sailed Governor Edward Cornwallis aboard  to establish Halifax, Nova Scotia (1749).

Naval career 

During the Seven Years' War, he commanded  at the Battle of Minorca (1756). He also fought in the action of April 5, 1757 in the strait of Gibraltar when he commanded  and the French fleet successfully evaded the British naval forces to arrive at Louisbourg.  Finally, he commanded  at the Battle of Lagos (1759).  In the battle, two of his crew were killed and six were wounded. While still under Lloyd's command, the ship sank the following year off Drake's Island.

After the war, Lloyd retired to the family estate in Carmarthenshire.  He rose by seniority through the various flag ranks, eventually becoming Admiral of the White on 1 June 1795.  He was buried at St Cadog's Church in Llangadog, Wales and a stone monument was mounted on the wall.

Real estate 
In 1755, he was granted the power of attorney to receive rents from his father's estate. In 1761 he was living in Hammersmith, Middlesex and inherited a large number of properties from his parents.  He contested the will of his relative Madame Bridget Bevan in 1779.

Family 

He was born in Dan yr allt (formerly Allt y meibion), Llanelli, Carmarthenshire to John Lloyd (1702–1728) and Mary Lloyd.  (When John died, Mary re-married Thomas Corbett of St Martin-in-the-Fields, esquire.) William's siblings Vaughan and Rachel are buried in Hammersmith Church. Along with William, neither sibling married or had children. Rachel was a wealthy Housekeeper at Kensington Palace and a pastel artist.

William died in 1796 and was buried in the St. Cadog's church along with his father John and grandfather Thomas, both of whom were High Sheriffs of Carmarthenshire. William's father John created a monument in St. Cadog's church to his parents Thomas (d. 1720) and Rachel Lloyd (d.1702). William's godchild John William Lloyd commissioned another monument in the St. Cadog's church for his son John Philipp Lloyd (d. 1849).

His will is in the National Archives.  William divested the Dan y rallt estate to trustees for his kinsman Sir Thomas Stepney, 9th Baronet (d. 1825), the youngest son of Thomas Stepney of Llanelli, 7th baronet.
He also left part of his estate to his godchild John William Lloyd.

Gallery

See also 
 List of Royal Navy admirals (1707–current)

References

External links 
 EXPLORATION TYWI! DAN YR ALLT, LLANGADOG, ARCHAEOLOGICAL EVALUATION 2009 By Philip Poucher
 Family Pedigree
 Three Decks – William Lloyd

Admirals of the Royal Navy